His Name Was Holy Ghost (also known as They Call Him Holy Ghost and El halcón de Sierra Madre) is a 1972 Italian-Spanish Spaghetti Western film directed by Giuliano Carnimeo and starring Gianni Garko. It is the sequel of They Call Me Hallelujah.

Plot

Cast

See also 
 List of Italian films of 1972
 List of Spanish films of 1972

References

External links

Spanish Western (genre) films
Spaghetti Western films
1972 Western (genre) films
1972 films
Films directed by Giuliano Carnimeo
Films produced by Ricardo Sanz
1970s Italian films